Manor Grand Prix Racing Limited, trading as Manor Racing MRT or Pertamina Manor Racing MRT, was a British Formula One racing team and constructor based in Banbury, Oxfordshire in the United Kingdom.

The team collapsed in November 2014 owing around £60m, two of the companies out of pocket being Marussia's former competitors McLaren and Ferrari. On 19 January 2015, the administrators of Marussia announced that the auction of its cars and assets had been cancelled so as to allow a possible buy out to take place. The team exited administration on 19 February 2015, and was re-established as the "Manor Marussia F1 Team" after a CVA had been signed and new investment was secured to rescue the team. It was later announced that OVO Energy Owner and CEO, Stephen Fitzpatrick had purchased the team. The team retained "Marussia" as its constructor name throughout the 2015 season, also adopting a British licence. On 19 January 2016, the team announced it would be renamed to "Manor Racing".

The team competed under the constructor name MRT which stands for Manor Racing Team.

On 6 January 2017, it was announced that Manor's parent company, Just Racing Services, had been placed into administration by administrators at FRP Advisory. On 27 January, Just Racing Services collapsed after failing to find a buyer. The team closed before the start of the 2017 season, in March 2017 as any attempt to sell the team to a new owner did not come to fruition. Their 2017 entry fee was returned at the end of 2017. The arrival of Haas F1 in  has subsequently displaced Manor and the other 2010 teams as the sport's latest entry.

History

Background

In 2009, Manor Grand Prix were awarded an entry into Formula One for the  season, as a tie-up between successful junior racing team Manor Motorsport and Wirth Research. Before the end of that year, these entities became known as Virgin Racing, after Richard Branson's Virgin Group of companies who had bought the title sponsorship rights. Marussia were one of the team's partners for its debut season, where it finished in twelfth and last place in the Constructors' Championship. In November 2010, Marussia Motors purchased a controlling stake in the team, and the team became known as 'Marussia Virgin Racing' for the  season.

Following a disappointing start to the 2011 season, the team parted company with Wirth Research and entered a partnership with McLaren Applied Technologies ahead of the 2012 season. With this came a relocation from the original base in Dinnington, to the old Wirth premises in Banbury in Great Britain. Meanwhile, the team again finished the year bottom of the Constructors' Championship. In November 2011, it applied to the Formula One commission to formally change their constructor name for the 2012 season from Virgin to Marussia, to reflect their new ownership becoming Marussia F1 Team in the process. Permission was granted before being formally ratified at a meeting of the FIA World Motor Sport Council. The team competed as Marussia until  when it collapsed mid-season.

In May 2015 the team announced the arrival of Luca Furbatto as Chief Designer. Bob Bell also joined as Consultant.

A deal to save the team was put together ahead of the  season, with Manor operating the team independently of Marussia, though the team kept the Marussia name to secure prize money from the 2014 season.

In December 2015 Dave Ryan was appointed Team Principal for the team and two further appointments followed in January 2016, the team appointed former Ferrari chief designer Nikolas Tombazis as its chief aerodynamicist, and recruited fellow former Ferrari employee Pat Fry as an engineering consultant.

In February 2016, Manor confirmed that Pascal Wehrlein, 2015 DTM champion and Mercedes junior driver, and Rio Haryanto would race for the team in 2016.

2016 season

On 22 February 2016, Manor launched their new car at the first test. The team had undergone a complete re-branding under the ownership of Fitzpatrick, and had seen the team colours change to red, white and blue.

During the first race of the season in Australia, Rio Haryanto retired due to a drivetrain problem, while Pascal Wehrlein finished in sixteenth place. At the next race, in Bahrain, Wehrlein was one place away from reaching Q2 for the first time in his career, qualifying sixteenth. Haryanto finished the race, a career first, in 17th place.

Wehrlein also scored the team's first ever point and its best result to date by finishing 10th in the race.

The team's reserve driver, Alexander Rossi, won the Indianapolis 500.

Before the 2016 Belgian Grand Prix, Rio Haryanto was demoted to reserve driver due to "his failure to meet his contractual obligations", due to his sponsors being unable to fulfill their financial commitments. For the remaining nine races of the season, he was replaced by Esteban Ocon, who had made frequent appearances testing for both Renault and Mercedes and who was considered to be a promising young talent.

At the end of a Brazilian Grand Prix, which was held in adverse conditions, Sauber gained two points, putting them ahead of Manor in the championship, costing the team £30 million in prize money.

Before the Abu Dhabi Grand Prix reports circulated and were confirmed by Stephen Fitzpatrick, that the team were in advanced talks with a new investor. However, in early January 2017 the team's parent company was put under administration after the investment talks failed, putting their participation in the 2017 season into doubt. Although they paid their 2017 entry fee, since their participation did not materialise, the entry fee was returned by the FIA at the end of 2017.

Complete Formula One results
(key) (results in bold indicate pole position; races in italics indicate fastest lap)

References

External links

 

Formula One constructors
Formula One entrants
British racecar constructors
Companies based in Banbury